Defending champion Stéphane Houdet and his partner Shingo Kunieda defeated Robin Ammerlaan and Stefan Olsson in the final, 6–0, 5–7, [10–8] to win the men's doubles wheelchair tennis title at the 2010 French Open.

Houdet and Michael Jérémiasz were the defending champions, but Jérémiasz did not compete this year.

Seeds
 Stéphane Houdet /   Shingo Kunieda (champions)
 Maikel Scheffers /  Ronald Vink (semifinals)

Draw

Finals

References
Main Draw

Wheelchair Men's Doubles
French Open, 2010 Men's Doubles